Miss República Dominicana 2012 was held April 17, 2012 in Renaissance Auditorio de Festival del Hotel Jaragua, Santo Domingo, Dominican Republic. The Miss República Dominicana 2012 winner will represent the Dominican Republic in Miss Universe 2012. The First Runner-up or Miss Continente Dominicana will enter Miss Continente Americano 2012. The Second Runner-up or Miss RD Hispanoamericana will enter Reina Hispanoamericana 2012. The Third Runner-up will enter Miss Globe International 2012. The Fourth Runner-up or Miss RD América Latina will enter Miss América Latina 2012. The winner was crowned by Dalia Fernández, Miss Dominican Republic 2011.

Results
* Was voted into the Top 15 by popular votes thru Text Messaging.

Candidates

Other pageant notes

Replacements
 Comunidad Dominicana en Estados Unidos: Nathalie Muñoz was appointed as Miss Comunidad Dominicana en Estados Unidos after Mio Almonte was dethroned for undisclosed reasons.

References

External links
Official website

Miss Dominican Republic
Dominican Republic